Dantebad is an aquatics venue located in the greater Munich, Germany area. During the 1972 Summer Olympics, it hosted preliminaries for the water polo competition.

The venue was considered as host for the swimming and diving competition when Munich was awarded the games in 1966, but was not up to standards for FINA who only allowed those competitions to be indoors.

References
1972 Summer Olympics official report. Volume 2. Part 2. pp. 176–7, 212–3.
1972 Summer Olympics official report. Volume 3. p. 325.

Venues of the 1972 Summer Olympics
Olympic water polo venues
Indoor arenas in Germany
Sports venues in Bavaria
Buildings and structures in Munich